Chandra Nandini is an Indian Hindi-language Historical fictional drama television series which aired on Star Plus from 10 October 2016 until 10 November 2017. It was produced by Ekta Kapoor under her banner Balaji Telefilms and is directed by Ranjan Kumar Singh. Starring Rajat Tokas as Chandragupta Maurya and Shweta Basu Prasad as a princess Nandni, the story-line is loosely based on the life of Chandragupta Maurya.

Synopsis
The show starts with a voice-over of mother India saying about Chandragupta Maurya and Nandini. A local king, Suryagupta Maurya rules the country with his pregnant wife, Moora. An invitation comes from Magadha for a festival. When they go there, Magadha queen, Avantika is cheating her husband with a barber named Nanda. When Suryagupta finds it, Nanda kills the king of Magadha. Then, Nanda kills Suryagupta. Moora escapes and delivers a boy. She hides her son in a cattle pound and is arrested by Nanda. A woman named Kanika finds Moora's son and adopts him as Chandra, unaware his truth.

8 years later
Chandra lives with his adopted parents. Moora is still in Nanda's prison and waits for her son. Nanda and Avantika had a daughter, Nandini after nine sons. Meanwhile, Chandra leaves home as Kanika suffers from her husband because of him. He reaches Magadha and meets Chanakya, who tries to save Magadh from Nanda. Chanakya sees Chandra's talents and realizes that Chandra is the future king. He keeps Chandra in his presence and teaches him.

9 years later
Now, Chandra is grown up and becomes talented. He tries to attack Magadha and eventually succeeds with the help of small kings. Nandini marries Chandra to save her mother and kingdom. Eventually, love blossoms between them. Nandini's twin sister, Roopa tries to kill Nandini. Nanda stabs Nandini mistaking her to be Roopa, post which Nandini realizes about Nanda's reality. Nanda and Seleucus plan to attack Chandra. Chandra convinces Seleucus not to fight against him and decides to make Nicator's daughter, Helena as the chief queen of Magadha. Chandra's second wife, Durdhara, who is pregnant, becomes sick. Helena poisons Durdhara and kills her. Durdhara's baby was taken by surgery. Helena makes Chandra into believing that Nandini killed Durdhara. Believing her, Chandra banishes Nandini out of Magadha.

1 year later
Chandra now lives with Helena and Durdhara's son, Bindusara. Nandini is teaching other royal kids at a Gurukul. Chandra brings Nandini back to Magadh and as Bindusara's nanny. Nanda and his minister, Amatya Rakshas send a Vishkanya (poisonous seductress) to Magadha to kill Chandra. She arrives in the Magadha as a princess Vishaka. Vishaka tries to seduce Chandra, and he pretends to fall in love with her to irritate Nandini.

Chandra decides to marry Vishaka, and he prepares for the grand wedding. Vishaka's plans to kill Chandra all go in vain every time because Nandini intervenes and saves him. Nandini exposes Vishaka, and the Vishkanya is imprisoned. Helena's mother, Apama slow poisons Nandini. Nandini is pushed into a very critical state and finally saved by Vishaka's poison. Chandra exposes Apama as Durdhara's murderer and apologizes Nandini for his mistakes.

8 years later
Chandra and Nandini are leading a happy life with Bindusara. Nandini is pregnant with Chandra's child. Helena feels jealous and manipulates Bindusara into believing that Nandini had killed Durdhara in past. Blindly believing Helena, Bindusara starts to hate Nandini and decides to take revenge. In a hunting trip, Bindusara pushes Nandini from a cliff. He lies everyone that Nandini had slipped from the cliff accidentally. Chandra grieves for Nandini's death and forgets his royal duties.

10 years later
Chandra is living like an ascetic after Nandini's unexpected death. Magadha is now under Helena's rule. Bindusara, Malayketu and Chaaya's son, Bhadraketu, Helena's children, Alice and Adonis, are all grown up. Helena is still keeping Bindusara as her puppet and poisons his mind. On the other hand, Nandini is alive and is saved by an older man. She has lost her memory and lives as Prabha now. She shares a motherly bond with the older man's granddaughter, Dharma. Prabha and Dharma visit Magadh as servants in the royal palace. Dharma started to hold a grudge against Bindusara. Chandra also finds Prabha, and he makes her his queen again. However, Helena provokes Bindusara against Chandra, which results in a great misunderstanding. Bindusara marries a princess Charumati, who ill-treats Dharma. Alice falls in love with Prince Karthikey of Champanagar and wishes to marry him. She also informs her mother, Helena. Helena decides to make Chitralekha, Karthikey's sister to marry Bindusara so that Alice can marry Karthikeyan. She prepares for the wedding ceremony. On the wedding day, Chithraleka, who is already in love with Bhadraketu, runs away and asks Dharma to replace her in the marriage. Dharma unwillingly marries Bindusara. Later he thanks her for saving his dignity and promises that he will soon break the marriage. A new problem arises when Bhimdev claims Nandini to be his wife, Savitri, who enters the palace. Chandra and Nandini's relationship is put to the test.

It is then revealed that this man is a sorcerer, and he, along with his wife Mohini, put black magic on Chandra to separate him and Nandini. They are ordered by a mysterious person named Swanand to kill Chandra. But, Chanakya finds out about the secret of Bhimdev and Mohini. Both Chanakya and Nandini save Chandra from the effects of black magic. Nandini regains her memory and realizes her true identity.

Finally, the mysterious man, Swanand, attacks Magadh and tries to kill Chandra and takeover Magadh. But, Chandra and Bindusara overpower his army, and they kill him. Chandra and Nandini are reunited. Chandra forgives Helena on Nandini's request and sends her back to Greece with her children . Bindusara apologises to Nandini for his past mistakes. He starts to like Dharma, and they all live happily.

Cast

Main cast
 Rajat Tokas as Chandragupta Maurya aka Chandra – Emperor of Magadha; Suryagupta and Moora's son; Chhaya's brother; Chanakya's student; Durdhara’s widower; Helena and Nandini's husband; Bindusara, Alice and Adonis's father (2016-2017)
 Jineet Rath as Child Chandragupta. (2016)
 Shweta Basu Prasad as Chief Empress Nandini Maurya – Nanda and Avantika's daughter; Roopa's twin sister; Chandragupta's third wife; Bindusara and Dharma's adoptive mother. (2016–17) / Roopa - Nandini's evil twin (2016)
 Angel Roopchandani as Child Princess Nandini. (2016)
 Saanvi Talwar as Former Chief Empress Durdhara Maurya – Chandragupta's first wife; Bindusara's mother. (2016–17) (Dead)
Tanu Khan as Empress Helena Maurya – Seleucus and Apama's daughter; Chandragupta's second wife; Alice and Adonis's mother, Bindusara's step-mother; Durdhara's murderer. (2016–17)

Recurring cast 
 Siddharth Nigam as Crown Prince Bindusara Maurya – Chandragupta and Durdhara's son; Nandini's adopted son; Alice and Adonis's half-brother; Charumitra and Dharma's husband. (2017)
 Ayaan Zubair Rahmani as Child Prince Bindusara (2017)
Avneet Kaur as Princess Charumati Maurya – Bindusara's first wife. (2017)
 Prerna Sharma as Dharma – Nandini's adopted daughter; Bindusara's second wife. (2017)
 Arpit Ranka as Samrat Mahapadma Nanda – Former Emperor of Magadha; Avantika's husband; Nandini and her nine brother's father (2016–17) (Dead)
 Mansi Sharma as Maharani Avantika – Former Empress of Magadha; Nanda's second wife; Nandini and her nine brother's mother. (2016–17)
 Vidya Sinha as Queen Sonarika – Suryagupta's mother; Chhaya and Chandragupta's grandmother; Bindusara, Bhadraketu, Alice and Adonis's great-grandmother (2016–17)
 Papiya Sengupta as Queen Moora – Suryagupta's wife; Chhaya and Chandragupta's mother; Bindusara, Bhadraketu, Alice and Adonis's grandmother. (2016-2017)
 Urfi Javed / Piya Valecha as Princess Chhaya – Suryagupta and Moora's daughter; Chandragupta's sister; Malayketu's wife; Bhadraketu's mother. (2016–17)
 Chetan Hansraj as Maharaj Malayketu – Chhaya's second husband; Bhadraketu's father. (2016–2017)
 Abhishek Nigam as Prince Bhadraketu – Chhaya and Malayketu's son; Chitralekha's husband. (2017)
 Abhijeet Sooryvanshe (2017)
 Pragati Chourasiya as Princess Chitralekha – Princess of Champanagar; Bhadraketu's wife. (2017)
 Gautam Nain as Prince Adonis – Chandragupta and Helena's son; Alice's brother; Bindusara's half-brother. (2017)
 Nirisha Basnett as Princess Alice – Chandragupta and Helena's daughter; Adonis's sister; Bindusara's half-sister; Kartikey's wife (2017)
 Sheezan K as Prince Kartikay – Prince of Champanagar; Alice's husband (2017)
 Sheeba Chaddha as Apama – Former Queen of Greece; Seleucus's wife; Helena's mother. (2017)
 Kristian Hedegaard Petersen as Seleucus I Nikator – King of Greece; Apama's husband; Helena's father. (2016-2017)
 Ishaan Singh Manhas as Satyajeet – Chhaaya's first husband (2016)
 Lokesh Batta as Rajkumar Dhananand – Mahapadma Nanda's son (2016)
 Rushiraj Pawar as Sona Nanda – Dhana Nanda's son (2016)
 Danish Bagga as Pandugrath – Mahapadma Nanda's seemingly mentally disabled son. (2016–17)
 Geetanjali Mishra as Maharani Sunanda – Mahapadma Nanda's first wife (2016–17)
Himanshu Rai as Subhadra – Chanakya's pupil
 Vibhuti Thakur as Kanika – Chandragupta's foster mother (2016–17)
 Andrea Ravera as Megasthenes
 Khushboo Shroff as Gautami
 Ankur Malhotra as Maharaj Ambhi (2016)
 Vikas Salgotra as Maharaj Purushottam (Porus) (2016)
 Shikha Singh as a Princess (cameo role) (2016)
 Pooja Banerjee as Princess "Vishaka" Vishkanya. (2017)
 Ahad Ali Aamir as Prince Bandhir (2017)
 Charmi Dhami as Princess Tilottama – Maadhav and Maalti's daughter (2017)
 Lavina Tandon as Mohini - an enchantress (2017)
 Athar Siddiqui as Bheem Dev - Mohini's husband (2017)
Rahul Sharma as Madhav Chandra's cousin brother)
Ekroop Bedi as Kinnari - Nandini's best friend (2016)
 Garima Arora as Madhuram
 Vikas Singh Rajput
Ahmad Harhash as Prince Malhotra (2016) (2017)

Production
This is regarded as one of the costliest series produced by Ekta Kapoor under Balaji Telefilms. On 21 September 2016, a press conference was held in Mumbai with the presence of Producer Ekta Kapoor and some actors including the leads Rajat Tokas and Shweta Basu Prasad. Director Santram Verma who directed the pilot episode of the series opted out after it and was replaced by Ranjan Kumar Singh.

In October 2016, about 300 horses were auditioned for a sequence for the lead Tokas.

Speaking about his role male lead Rajat Tokas said, "I am really looking forward to portraying the mighty king, Chandragupta Maurya. His and Nandni’s story is very different from what we’ve seen on TV so far. Theirs is a love story written with hatred." Female lead Shwetha Basu Prasad said, "This show marks my comeback on TV after quite some time. The character of Nandni is that of a strong princess, whose emotions and struggles, every woman would resonate with."

In 2017, the storyline of the series took a leap. During which Siddharth Nigam joined the cast as Bindusara, Avneet Kaur as Charumati. The series ended on 10 November 2017, due to fluctuations in its viewership, with Chandragupta becoming a Buddhist monk. The shooting of the series was completed on 2 November 2017.

Training

Filming
The initial scenes of the series was shot in the ancient locations of Magadh and Pataliputra in Patna. But, the series was mainly filmed in Mumbai.

Reception
India Today quoted the series as more masala, less history and reviewed, "The creators of the show have taken generous amount of creative liberty with the original story or history. The actors are not that bad; in fact, they are pretty okay.The palace looks super-animated, like it has just been put on the screen as an afterthought."

The Times of India stated, "Going by the trailer, Shweta Basu fits the role of Chandragupta's wife perfectly. When it comes to showcasing opulence, there is no one who does it better than Ekta Kapoor. Right from the costume to the setting, one can expect grand locations and beautifully decked men and women."

Adaptations
The series was dubbed in Tamil aired on Star Vijay.  In Sri Lanka, the show is broadcast in Sinhala on the Swarnavahini network. In Hindi the series airs in Malaysia on TV3.

Historical accuracy and inaccuracy 
While the character of Chandragupta  and some of the wars and conflicts shown are almost historically accurate, the character of Princess Nandni of Magadha itself along with her twin Roopa is considered completely fictional by many sources. Most historians said, Chandragupta married only twice, first to Durdhara who died while giving birth to Bindusara and years after he was married to daughter of Seleucus I Nicator (Helena as per the show) in a war-peace treaty. Chandragupta defeated  selecus and then arranged  a peace treaty,Chandragupta didn't convince Selecus before the war. Queen Nandni as per the show is described as daughter of the real Mahapadma Nanda which is contradicted as there is no historical evidence. It has been said Nandni's characterization is based upon most of Durdhara character derived from historical texts, novelization and poetries. However, there are several historical sources have been mentioned the existence of Queen Nandni, among them one evidence has found in 350 BC Greek Historian Megasthenes' book called Indika as he served as an Ambassador in Royal Court of Chandragupta Maurya. According to this Book Queen Nidarus (presumably Greek accent of Nandni) was Mahapadma Nanda / Dhana Nanda's daughter who was given to Samrat Chandragupta as a war-peace treaty. In that book, she is mentioned as a great warrior and a leader.

References

External links
 Chandra Nandni Streaming On Hotstar

Balaji Telefilms television series
StarPlus original programming
2016 Indian television series debuts
Hindi-language television shows
Indian historical television series
Indian period television series
Indian drama television series
2017 Indian television series endings